The 1955 Ladies Open Championships was held at the Lansdowne Club in London from 7–12 December 1954. Janet Morgan won her sixth consecutive title defeating Ruth Turner in the final. The competition was held during December 1954 but formed part of the 1954/1955 season.

Seeds

Draw and results

First round

denotes seed *

Second round

Third round

Quarter-finals

Semi-finals

Final

References

Women's British Open Squash Championships
Women's British Open Squash Championships
Women's British Open Squash Championships
Squash competitions in London
Women's British Open Championships
British Open Championships 
Women's British Open Squash Championships